Raymond Libregts (born 25 December 1964 in Rotterdam) is a Dutch football coach. Libregts is the son of former Dutch national team coach Thijs Libregts.

Coaching career

RBC Roosendaal
Libregts began his coaching career in 2001 as the assistant coach at Dutch club RBC Roosendaal. He left during the 2002–03 season.

Go Ahead Eagles
Libregts signed with Go Ahead Eagles on 15 January 2003 as head coach of the first team who were in the Eerste Divisie, the second division of Dutch football. His first full season in charge saw Eagles finish in 9th place in the Eerste. His next and final full season Eagles would end in 17th place in the second division.  Libregts  then left the club on 30 June 2005.

PSV Eindhoven
After leaving Eagles, Libregts joined FC Groningen as assistant coach to Ron Jans. After spending four years at Groningen, Libregts  along with Jans moved to SC Heerenveen where Raymond stayed for one season before moving to PSV Eindhoven as the under-19 head coach. Libregts has an astounding record with PSV under-19. In his one-year spell with the Dutch club, he hasn’t lost a single match. He has won 75 per cent of the matches while drawing 25 per cent.

India
Libregts came to India after handing over the reins of the PSV Youth team to Phillip Cocu. On 15 May 2012 it was announced that Libregts had arrived in India to take charge of the India U23 team and Pailan Arrows, the AIFF's development team. This is pending on a look at the facilities in India by Libregts before making his decision.

1. FC Nürnberg
On 22 October 2013 he started as an assistant coach to Gertjan Verbeek at the German Bundesliga club 1. FC Nürnberg.

VfL Bochum
In January 2015 he took over a new job as an assistant coach. He again works together with Gertjan Verbeek who is coach of VfL Bochum.

On 25 April 2016 it was announced, that Libregts wouldn't work at the club any more.

References

External links
 

1964 births
Living people
Dutch footballers
Eredivisie players
VVV-Venlo players
Sparta Rotterdam players
MVV Maastricht players
FC Eindhoven players
Go Ahead Eagles managers
FC Groningen non-playing staff
VfL Bochum non-playing staff
Everton F.C. non-playing staff
Footballers from Rotterdam
Association football defenders
Dutch football managers
Expatriate football managers in Belarus
SC Heerenveen non-playing staff